Pago Calzadilla is a Spanish winery in Castilla–La Mancha, Spain. The winery uses the Vino de Pago wine appellation, a classification for Spanish wine applied to individual vineyards or wine estates, unlike the Denominación de Origen Protegida (DOP) or Denominación de Origen Calificada (DOCa) which is applied to an entire wine region. The Pago Calzadilla winery was formed as a Vino de Pago in 2011, and geographically it lies within the extent of the Uclés DOP. At just 22 hectares, Pago Calzadilla is the smallest wine DOP in Spain.

References

External links

 

Wine regions of Spain
Spanish wine
Appellations
Wine classification